Walter Sedlmayr (6 January 1926 – 14 July 1990) was a popular German stage, television, and film actor from Bavaria. His murder in 1990 was widely publicized.

Career
After his 1945 wartime Abitur, Sedlmayr served as a Flakhelfer towards the end of World War II. His acting career began with minor roles with the Münchner Kammerspiele, for which he played more than 25 years, and in numerous Heimatfilme during the 1940s and 1950s.

In 1971, by now an associate of Rainer Werner Fassbinder, Sedlmayr was briefly arrested because a stolen artwork, the Blutenburger Madonna, was found in his house. He was later acquitted of all charges, and the media attention given to his trial helped him gain major roles. His breakthrough came with the leading role in Hans-Jürgen Syberberg's film Theodor Hierneis oder Wie man ehem. Hofkoch wird (1972). Afterwards, Sedlmayr was cast in numerous popular German TV shows, including , Der Herr Kottnik, Der Millionenbauer, and Polizeiinspektion 1; he also frequently appeared on stage and in other media.

Murder
On 15 July 1990, Sedlmayr was found dead in the bedroom of his Munich apartment. He had been tied up, stabbed in the stomach with a knife and beaten about the head with a hammer. On 21 May 1993, two half-brothers, Wolfgang Werlé and Manfred Lauber, former business associates of Sedlmayr, were found guilty of his murder and sentenced to life in prison. The killers were released from prison in 2007 and 2008.

In 2009, the two men convicted of the killing took legal action demanding the removal of their names from the German and English language Wikipedia, arguing that it invaded their right to privacy. The names were removed from the German Wikipedia, while the English-speaking Wikipedia community declined  to do so, supported by the Wikimedia Foundation, which  contested the validity of the ruling as it neither operates nor has assets in Germany. In December 2009 the Federal Court of Justice, the highest court of ordinary jurisdiction in Germany, ruled that the convicted have no right of removal of their names from internet archives as this would interfere too strongly with the right of free speech. After this ruling, the names were again included in the German Wikipedia. In June 2018, the European Court of Human Rights upheld the decision of the Federal Court of Justice to reject the request to ban publication of the killers' names.

Filmography

TV appearances

Award
In 1973, Sedlmayr won the Outstanding Individual Achievement: Actor Deutscher Filmpreis award for his role in Theodor Hierneis oder Wie man ehemaliger Hofkoch wird.

In June 2000, the Walter-Sedlmayr-Platz was named after him.

References

External links
 
 
 

1926 births
1990 deaths
20th-century German male actors
20th-century German male writers
German gay actors
German male film actors
German male television actors
German murder victims
German television directors
German television writers
German male screenwriters
Male television writers
German LGBT screenwriters
Gay screenwriters
1990 murders in Germany
Male actors from Munich
People murdered in Germany
German Film Award winners
Recipients of the Cross of the Order of Merit of the Federal Republic of Germany
Deaths by stabbing in Germany
Deaths by beating in Europe
Luftwaffenhelfer
20th-century German screenwriters
20th-century German LGBT people